PAR3 may refer to:

 Parchive, an error correction system for computer files. The third version is known as PAR3.
 Protease activated receptor 3, a G-protein coupled receptor protein
 Pseudoautosomal region 3, a region of homologous sequences between the human X and Y chromosome
 Partitioning defective 3 homolog, a protein that in humans is encoded by the PARD3 gene

See also
 3PAR